The men's 100m freestyle B3 event at the 1996 Summer Paralympics consisted of 11 competing athletes. The swimmers with the top 8 times in the pool advanced to the finals. Walter Wu received a gold medal, breaking a Paralympic record. Ebert Kleynhans and Vladmir Tchesnov came second and third respectively.

Results 
Q = qualified for final. WR = World Record. PR = Paralympic Record. AM = Americas Record. AF = African Record.

Heats

Finals

References 

1996 in swimming
Men's 100 metre freestyle
Swimming at the 1996 Summer Paralympics